"Let There Be Rock" is a song by Australian hard rock band AC/DC. It is the third and title track of their album Let There Be Rock, released in March 1977, and was written by Angus Young, Malcolm Young, and Bon Scott.

It was also released as a single, with a B-side of "Problem Child", in 1977.

Composition
The song provides an encapsulated, fictionalised version of the history of rock 'n' roll. Building on a line from the Chuck Berry song "Roll Over Beethoven": "... tell Tchaikovsky the news", "Let There Be Rock" reveals that Tchaikovsky did in fact receive the message and subsequently shared it with the masses, resulting in the rise of rock 'n' roll.

Following rock's birth, rock bands appeared everywhere, musicians found fame (while businesses made money off their efforts), and millions of people learned how to play electric guitar. The third and final verse speaks of a "42-decibel" rock band playing good, loud music in an establishment called "The Shaking Hand". This is usually changed to "92-decibel" in live versions of the song. After the final verse, the song ends with an extended solo by Angus Young, which consists mainly of tremolo picking, string bends, and hammer-ons.

Live recordings
Being one of AC/DC's most popular songs, "Let There Be Rock" has been included on four of the band's six official live albums: If You Want Blood You've Got It (sung by Bon Scott, 1978), Live: 2 CD Collector's Edition (sung by Scott's replacement Brian Johnson, 1992), Let There Be Rock: The Movie (Scott, 1979), released in 1997 as part of the Bonfire box set, Stiff Upper Lip Tour Edition (Johnson, 2001), recorded from Plaza De Toros in Madrid from 1996, and Live At River Plate (Johnson, 2012), with the last recorded during AC/DC's Black Ice World Tour at River Plate Stadium in Buenos Aires on 4 December 2009.

Live performances of the song often go into a section not included on the studio version, with Angus Young performing an extended solo without accompaniment.

It is the final song played in Let There Be Rock: The Movie and at the immediate conclusion the words "To Bon" appear on the screen. On recent tours, the song has concluded the regular set before the band reappears for encores.

Music video
The music video for "Let There Be Rock" was filmed in July 1977. It was recorded in the Kirk Gallery church in Surry Hills, New South Wales and featured Bon Scott, Angus Young, Malcolm Young, Phil Rudd, and Cliff Williams, who replaced Mark Evans as the band's bassist shortly after the Let There Be Rock album was released. This marked one of Williams' first public appearances with AC/DC. Scott was dressed as a priest and the rest of the band as altar boys, with Angus Young wearing a halo prop on his head. Towards the end of the video it shows Angus, and the rest of the band jamming while he plays the guitar. In an alternate ending of the video, the colors are morphed and the camera zooms in on the stained glass window. According to an interview with the Young brothers, Scott injured himself in the final jump from the podium. In the video and studio recording, Scott also sings the pre-chorus incorrectly, introducing 'sound' before 'light.' This is corrected during live performances of the song.

Critical reception
"Let There Be Rock" is widely considered one of the band's best songs. The Guardian ranked the song number four on its list of the 40 greatest AC/DC songs, and the British rock magazine Kerrang! ranked the song number three on its list of the 20 greatest AC/DC songs.

Appearances in popular culture
"Let There Be Rock" is a playable song in the music video game Rock Band 2.  A television advertisement for the game features a man lip syncing to a clip of the song while others are shown playing the game controller instruments in time to the music. In addition, the Live at Donington version is also available in the AC/DC Live: Rock Band Track Pack.

The song was also alluded to in the Drive-By Truckers song of the same name from 2001's Southern Rock Opera. The song specifically mentions Bon Scott, Randy Rhoads, as well as making references to other deceased rock stars such as members of Lynyrd Skynyrd and Phil Lynott of Thin Lizzy fame.

Cover versions
The Australian punk rock group the Hard-Ons recorded a cover version featuring Henry Rollins on lead vocals, and released it as a single in 1991. The song peaked at number 65 on the ARIA Charts in July 1991.
The Serbian funk rock band Deca Loših Muzičara released a cover version of the song in 1997.

Personnel
Bon Scott – lead vocals
Angus Young – lead guitar
Malcolm Young – rhythm guitar
Mark Evans – bass
Phil Rudd – drums

Production
Producers: Harry Vanda, George Young

Charts

References

AC/DC songs
1977 singles
Songs written by Angus Young
Songs written by Bon Scott
Songs written by Malcolm Young
Song recordings produced by Harry Vanda
Song recordings produced by George Young (rock musician)
Blues rock songs
1977 songs
Atco Records singles
Songs about rock music
Rock-and-roll songs
Cultural depictions of Pyotr Ilyich Tchaikovsky